The North Carolina Provincial Congresses were extra-legal unicameral legislative bodies formed in 1774 through 1776 by the people of the Province of North Carolina, independent of the British colonial government.  There were five congresses. They met in the towns of New Bern (1st and 2nd), Hillsborough (3rd), and Halifax (4th and 5th). The 4th conference approved the Halifax Resolves, the first resolution of one of Thirteen Colonies to call for independence from Great Britain. Five months later it would empower the state's delegates to the Second Continental Congress to concur to the United States Declaration of Independence. The 5th conference approved the Constitution of North Carolina and elected Richard Caswell as governor of the State of North Carolina. After the 5th conference, the new North Carolina General Assembly met in April 1777.

Congresses
Five extra-legal unicameral bodies called the North Carolina Provincial Congresses met beginning in the summer of 1774. They were modeled after the colonial lower house (House of Commons). These congresses created a government structure, issued bills of credit to pay for the movement, organized an army for defense, wrote a constitution and bill of rights that established the state of North Carolina, and elected their first acting governor in the fifth congress that met in 1776. These congresses paved the way for the first meeting of the North Carolina state Legislature on April 7, 1777, in New Bern, North Carolina.

First Provincial Congress

The first such congress met at the Tryon Palace in New Bern, from August 25 to 27, 1774. It was the first such gathering anywhere in the Thirteen Colonies held in defiance of British orders.

Its moderator (president) was John Harvey, who was concurrently the last speaker of the Province of North Carolina General Assembly of 1775 House of Burgesses.

This first provincial congress, with 69 delegates from 30 of the then-36 counties, approved the calling of a Continental Congress and elected William Hooper, Joseph Hewes, and Richard Caswell as the colony's delegates thereto. The congress also approved a trade boycott to protest British actions against New England.

Second Provincial Congress

The second congress also met at New Bern, from April 3 to 7, 1775. John Harvey once again served as moderator. The congress met at the same place and almost the same time as the colonial assembly, and had almost exactly the same membership. This infuriated the royal governor, Josiah Martin, who dissolved the colonial legislature on April 8 and never called another. This congress approved the Continental Association, an economic boycott of Great Britain authorized by the First Continental Congress. Just after this congress met, news reached North Carolina about the Battle of Lexington and Concord in Massachusetts. Following this news, Governor Josiah Martin fled and this ended the royal government in the Province. The first military action occurred on July 18 when patriots burned Fort Johnston, where Governor Martin had transferred his headquarters.

Third Provincial Congress

The third congress met in Hillsborough, from August 20 to September 10, 1775. Its president was Samuel Johnston (Harvey had recently died). This congress, which included representatives of every county and town, officially established itself as the highest governmental body in the province (British Governor Martin had fled, ending royal government).

To govern North Carolina when the congress was not in session, a 13-member Provincial Council, or Council of Safety, was elected, constituting the first executive body in North Carolina free of British rule. Cornelius Harnett was elected as the first president of the council. The congress divided the state into six military districts for purposes of organizing militia and for determining representation on the Council. These districts included Edenton, Halifax, Hillsborough, New Bern, Salisbury, and Wilmington. Later, an additional district, Morgan, was added for the western part of the state, including counties that eventually became part of Tennessee (Davidson, Greene, and Washington).

Fourth Provincial Congress

In the present day, the fourth North Carolina Provincial Congress is sometimes referred to as the "Halifax Assembly." The fourth congress, also presided over by Samuel Johnston, met in Halifax, from April 4 to May 14, 1776. Allen Jones served as vice-president.

This congress passed what became known as the Halifax Resolves, the first "official" endorsement of independence from Great Britain by one of the Thirteen Colonies. Joseph Hewes presented the Halifax Resolves to the Continental Congress on May 27, the same day that Virginia delegates presented similar resolves.

Fifth Provincial Congress

The Fifth and last Provincial Congress met at Halifax from November 12 to December 23, 1776. Richard Caswell served as president, with Cornelius Harnett as vice-president.

This congress approved the first Constitution of North Carolina, along with a "Declaration of Rights." It elected Caswell to serve as acting governor until the province's first General Assembly could meet to elect a governor.

See also
 Constitution of North Carolina
 Fayetteville Convention of 1789 (ratified the U.S. Constitution)
 Hillsborough Convention of 1788
 List of North Carolina state legislatures
 North Carolina General Assembly of 1777
 Provincial Congress

References

Further reading
 
 
 

North Carolina in the American Revolution
1774 establishments in North Carolina
1776 disestablishments in North Carolina
Government of North Carolina
North Carolina